Mi segunda madre is a Mexican telenovela produced by Juan Osorio for Televisa and broadcast by Canal de las Estrellas in 1989. It starred María Sorté, Enrique Novi and Daniela Castro as protagonists, with Fernando Ciangherotti and Alejandra Maldonado and Cynthia Klitbo as antagonists.

Plot
Daniela Lorente is an excellent designer, owner of a prestigious fashion house. She is married to Alberto, a bad man who has another wife and two children and steals money from him. One day Daniela discovers Alberto and decides to call the police to lock him up. When denounced by his wife Alberto he is sentenced to 10 years of imprisonment, swearing revenge on Daniela for having handed him over.

On the other hand, Juan Antonio Méndez Davila is an important businessman who has just suffered the death of his wife, leaving him only with a little girl named Mónica. Unfortunately for the little girl, her father has a frivolous and vain lover, Irene Montenegro. Daniela and Juan Antonio, both separately, decide to take a cruise to rest and forget about the problems that afflict them, in this way they meet on board and inevitably fall in love

The fortune to know each other is so great and the two are so happy that they decide to marry but Mónica does not want to accept Daniela as her second mother, even so Daniela loves her husband's daughter and little by little she manages to win the girl, who is Badly advised by Leticia, a schoolmate who envies Monica and pretends to be her friend to put ideas into her head against Daniela. After a time and various treatments, Daniela manages to get pregnant, which revives Monica's jealousy causing her to reject Daniela again. As her pregnancy progresses, the evil Irene pays a criminal named Germán who causes her a car accident. The event has terrible consequences for both Daniela and her son: Daniela is sterile due to the complications of delivery and her baby is premature and dies three weeks later.

Daniela is on the verge of suicide due to the death of her son. Monica seeing Daniela's suffering begins to love her and one day she finally calls her mom. 8 years later, Monica has grown up and is a beautiful woman and is the girlfriend of Lalo, Alberto's oldest son. Juan Antonio continues with great success in business but Daniela has not been able to overcome the death of her baby. In truth, Daniela's suffering is far from over: the past threatens her when Alberto leaves prison ready to take revenge on her for having sentenced him to confinement, for which he seduces Monica to destroy her family.

Cast 

 María Sorté as Daniela Lorente de Saucedo / de Méndez Dávila
 Daniela Castro as Mónica Méndez Dávila
 Enrique Novi as Juan Antonio Méndez Dávila
 Fernando Ciangherotti as Alberto Saucedo Maldonado (Killed by the bloody gangster Chamuko, nicknamed "Damn")
 Alejandra Maldonado as Irene Montenegro Olvera de Sánchez
 Alfredo Adame as Hans Lutmann
 Liliana Abud as Sonia Méndez Villanueva de Ramos
 Claudio Báez as Gerardo Peña Domínguez
 Arsenio Campos as Felipe Bretón
 Gina Moret as Gina Reis
 Ada Carrasco as Dolores "Lolita" de Astuariz
 Ernesto Gómez Cruz as Ignacio "Nacho"
 Cynthia Klitbo as Leticia Platas Amador (Dies after birth)
 Irma Lozano as Eva Enriquez Platas
 Héctor Suárez Gomis as Ramón (Dies of myocardial infarction)
 Toño Mauri as Federico "Fico"
 Lola Merino as María Gardenia "Margarita"
 Andrés Bonfiglio as Eduardo "Lalo" Saucedo Morales
 Blanca Torres as Amanda Morales
 Ana Bertha Espín as Amelia López
 Irlanda Mora as Angélica Hurtado
 Angelina Peláez as Arcelia Gomez
 Roberto Blandón as Marcelo (He was imprisoned and after the end of his term he was released)
 Raquel Morell as Raquel de Astuariz (Dies of cancer)
 Roberto Palazuelos as David (Killed by the bloody gangster Chamuko, nicknamed "Damn")
 Juan Verduzco as Enrique Ramos
 Gastón Tuset as Alejandro Oviedo
 Guy de Saint Cyr as Gonzalo
 Francesca Guillen as Luisita Peña
 Diana Ferretti as Carolina Morales Chávez de Saucedo
 Abel Salazar as Rafael Iglesias
 Carlos Riquelme as Justino Aguilar (Dies of myocardial infarction)
 Berenice Dominguez as Mónica Méndez (girl)
 Lucero Lander as Lucía de Méndez Dávila (Dies of a brain aneurysm)
 Héctor Pons as Lalo (child)
 Alejandra Gollas as Leticia (girl)
 Lupita Ochoa as Margarita (girl)
 Cristian Castro as Rubén Saucedo (Committed suicide in a mall after attempting to rob a store and hide from the police)
 Estela Ruiz as Malena
 Gabriel Pingarrón as Germán (Killed by the bloody gangster Chamuko, nicknamed "Damn")
 David Rencoret as Manuel "Manolo" Astuariz
 María Almela as Dora
 Rubén Rojo as Leopoldo Sánchez (Dies of old age)
 Jorge Fegán as Matías
 Mauricio Ferrari as Roberto
 Andrea Legarreta as Denisse
 Alejandro Aragón as Fernando
 Alejandra Espejo as Matilde
 Aurora Cortés as Melina
 Polly as Brenda
 Teresa Guízar as Rosa "Rosi" Almirez
 Fernanda Ruizos as Mariana
 Agustín López Zavala as Bloody gangster Chamuko nicknamed "Damn"#1
 Jesus Vargas as Bloody gangster Chamuko nicknamed "Damn"#2
 José María Torre as Manuel Justino "Tino"

Awards

References 

1989 telenovelas
Mexican telenovelas
1989 Mexican television series debuts
1989 Mexican television series endings
Spanish-language telenovelas
Television shows set in Mexico City
Television shows set in Monterrey
Televisa telenovelas